Jaime Morón (16 November 1950 – 2 December 2005) was a Colombian footballer who competed in the 1972 Summer Olympics.

References

External links

1950 births
2005 deaths
Sportspeople from Cartagena, Colombia
Association football forwards
Colombian footballers
Olympic footballers of Colombia
Footballers at the 1972 Summer Olympics
Millonarios F.C. players
Pan American Games medalists in football
Pan American Games silver medalists for Colombia
Footballers at the 1971 Pan American Games
Colombia international footballers
Medalists at the 1971 Pan American Games